Deepika English Medium School is a co-ed primary, middle, and senior secondary English medium school in sector five of the city Rourkela, in Odisha, India. The school was opened in 1976. Presently Pravin Kumar Sharma is the principal.

The school is affiliated to the Central Board of Secondary Education (CBSE), New Delhi pattern of education, which has Science and Commerce streams at the senior secondary level. The students are prepared for All-India Secondary and Senior Secondary Examinations conducted by the Central Board of Secondary Education, New Delhi.

History 
In 1976 the school began imparting primary education curriculum by the help from the women of Mahila Sangati and its founder principal V. N. N. Paniker, who was considered a pioneer in opening of Deepika English Medium School (Primary Section) school. In 1991, the school opened a new three-storey building with modern infrastructure in a different campus in sector five which had classes from six to twelve.

The infrastructure is maintained by the administration of Rourkela Steel Plant management. The school is divided into three sections, primary, middle, and secondary education. The primary section of the school has a different campus for the students from class one to five. The middle and senior secondary school function at another campus with modern infrastructure for classes six to twelve.

Campus 
The high school building comprises a three-storey building with computer centres, a work-experience block; science, maths, commerce, biology, chemistry and physics laboratories; library; basketball courts, cricket grounds, and football fields. The school has a library audio centre called Deepsikha on the premises.

The school had a complete renovation in the year 2013 in which the classrooms were remodernised along with a new sports ground and parking space.

Achievements and activities 
Activities include:
 Ranked among top 10 best schools in Odisha and Best school in Rourkela
 Inter-school and inter-state games
 NCC, Taekwon-Do, Scouts and Guides
 Co-curricular activities
 Inter-school cultural talent competitions

See also 
Deepika English Medium School (Primary Section)
Deepika Mahila Sanghati

References 

Primary schools in India
High schools and secondary schools in Odisha
Schools in Rourkela
Educational institutions established in 1976
1976 establishments in Orissa